Prince of Undeath is an adventure module for the 4th edition of the Dungeons & Dragons fantasy role-playing game.

Plot summary
Prince of Undeath is an epic-level D&D adventure designed to take characters from 27th to 30th level. In this adventure, the demon lord Orcus tries to usurp the Raven Queen's power over death using a shard of evil plucked from the depths of the Abyss. This adventure can be played as a stand-alone adventure or as the conclusion of a three-part series that spans 10 levels of gameplay.

Publication history
E3 Prince of Undeath was published in 2009, and was written by Bruce R. Cordell and Scott Fitzgerald Gray, with art by Jason Engle, Adam Gillespie, Mari Kolkowsky, William O'Connor, Wayne Reynolds, Jon Schindehette, Matias Tapia, and Ben Wootten.

Reception

References

Dungeons & Dragons modules
Role-playing game supplements introduced in 2009